Little Plastic Castle is the eighth studio album by singer-songwriter Ani DiFranco, released in 1998. It is her highest charting album on the Billboard charts, reaching number 22 on the Top 200 list.

The song "Glass House" earned DiFranco a Grammy Award nomination for Rock Female Vocalist.

Track listing
All songs by Ani DiFranco.

"Little Plastic Castle" – 4:32
"Fuel" – 4:01
"Gravel" – 3:32
"As Is" – 4:06
"Two Little Girls" – 4:57
"Deep Dish" – 3:38
"Loom" – 2:51
"Pixie" – 4:25
"Swan Dive" – 6:28
"Glass House" – 5:18
"Independence Day" – 3:44
"Pulse" – 14:15

Personnel
Ani DiFranco – acoustic guitar, guitar, percussion, concertina, drums, electric guitar, keyboards, vocals, bass pedals
Jon Blondell – trombone
Andrew Gilchrist – pump organ
Jon Hassell – trumpet
Sara Lee – bass guitar
Jerry Marotta – drums
Jason Mercer – electric bass, upright bass, vocals
John Mills – baritone saxophone
Gary Slechta – trumpet
Andy Stochansky – drums, vocals, talking drum

Production
Ani DiFranco – record producer, mixing, artwork
Bob Doidge – engineer
Mark Hallman – engineer
Andrew Gilchrist – mixing, engineer
Chris Bellman – mastering
Marty Lester – digital editing 
Adam Sloan – artwork
Asia Kepka – photography
Albert Sanchez – photography

Charts

References

Ani DiFranco albums
1998 albums
Righteous Babe Records albums